Shigueto Yamasaki Júnior (born July 30, 1966) is a retired male judoka from Brazil. 

Yamasaki claimed the gold medal in the Men's Bantamweight (– 60 kg) division at the 1991 Pan American Games in Havana, Cuba. In the final he defeated Canada's Ewan Beaton. He represented his native country at the 1992 Summer Olympics.

He is the cousin of Mario Yamasaki.

References
sports-reference

1966 births
Living people
Judoka at the 1992 Summer Olympics
Olympic judoka of Brazil
Brazilian male judoka
Brazilian people of Japanese descent
Pan American Games gold medalists for Brazil
Pan American Games medalists in judo
Goodwill Games medalists in judo
Judoka at the 1991 Pan American Games
Competitors at the 1990 Goodwill Games
Medalists at the 1991 Pan American Games
21st-century Brazilian people
20th-century Brazilian people